Nicolò da Voltri was an Italian painter who was active in Genoa from 1394 to 1417.  He was the most important native painter in Liguria, a coastal region of northwestern Italy.  His early development took place, probably in the 1370s, in the circle of Barnaba da Modena, who was active in Liguria between 1361 and 1383.  Da Voltri was influenced by the Sienese School painter Taddeo di Bartolo, who was in Liguria between 1393 and 1398.  Da Voltri's later paintings show clear influence of the Pisan painters working in Liguria between 1410 and 1420.

External links

 Dizionario enciclopedico Bolaffi dei pittori e degli incisori italiani dall'XI al XX secolo, Turin, Giulio Bolaffi, 1972–1976.
 Thieme, Ulrich and Felix Becker, Allgemeines Lexikon der bildenden Künstler von der Antike bis zur Gegenwart, Leipzig, E.A. Seemann, 1907.

14th-century Italian painters
Italian male painters
15th-century Italian painters
Painters from Genoa
Year of death unknown
Year of birth unknown